The following outline is provided as an overview of and topical guide to Monaco:

Monaco – small sovereign city-state located in Western Europe. Monaco lies on the northern coast of the Mediterranean and is surrounded by France.  It has the highest life expectancy at birth of any country, 89.4 years (2017 estimate). Monaco is often regarded as a tax haven, and many of its inhabitants are wealthy and from foreign countries (including France), although they are not a majority.

General reference 

 Pronunciation: 
 Common English country name:  Monaco
 Official English country name:  The Principality of Monaco
 Adjectives: Monégasque, Monacan
 Demonym(s):
 Etymology: Name of Monaco
 ISO country codes:  MC, MCO, 492
 ISO region codes:  ISO 3166-2:MC
 Internet country code top-level domain:  .mc

Geography of Monaco 

Geography of Monaco
 Monaco is: a country and a European microstate
 Land boundaries:   4.4 km
 Coastline:  Mediterranean Sea 4.1 km
 Population of Monaco: 33,000  - 205th most populous country

 Area of Monaco: 2.02 km2
 Atlas of Monaco

Location of Monaco 

 Monaco is situated within the following regions:
 Northern Hemisphere and Eastern Hemisphere
 Eurasia
 Europe
 Western Europe
 Southern Europe
 Time zone:  Central European Time (UTC+01), Central European Summer Time (UTC+02)
 Extreme points of Monaco
 High:  Chemin des Rivoires, a pathway located on the slopes of Mont Agel 
 Low:  Mediterranean Sea 0 m

Environment of Monaco 
 Climate of Monaco
 Wildlife of Monaco
 Fauna of Monaco
 Mammals of Monaco
 Birds of Monaco

Natural geographic features of Monaco 
 Land reclamation in Monaco
 Rivers of Monaco
 Rock of Monaco

Demography of Monaco 
Demographics of Monaco

Government and politics of Monaco 

 Form of government: constitutional monarchy
 Capital of Monaco: being a city-state, Monaco is its own capital
Administrative divisions: the principality is currently divided into ten wards 
Monaco-Ville
Monte Carlo/Spélugues
Fontvieille
Moneghetti/Bd de Belgique
Les Révoires
La Colle
La Condamine
Saint Michel
Larvotto/Bas Moulins
La Rousse/Saint Roman
 Elections in Monaco
 Political parties in Monaco
 Union Monégasque
 Promotion of the Monegasque Family
 Union for the Principality

Branches of the government of Monaco 
Government of Monaco
 National and Democratic Union
 National Council of Monaco
 Minister of State (Monaco)
 Crown Council of Monaco
 Council of Government (Monaco)
 Communal Council of Monaco

Executive branch of the government of Monaco 
 Head of state
 Prince of Monaco
 Head of government: Minister of State
 Pierre Dartout

Legislative branch of the government of Monaco 
 National Council of Monaco
 It's a Monaco unicameral parliament
 It may act independently of the Prince
 The prince may dissolve it at any time, provided that new elections be held within three months.

Judicial branch of the government of Monaco 
 Supreme Court of Monaco

Foreign relations of Monaco 
Foreign relations of Monaco
 Diplomatic missions in Monaco
 Diplomatic missions of Monaco
 France-Monaco relations
 Monaco–European Union relations
 Monaco–Russia relations
 Monaco–United States relations

International organization membership 
The Principality of Monaco is a member of:

Council of Europe (CE)
Food and Agriculture Organization (FAO)
International Atomic Energy Agency (IAEA)
International Chamber of Commerce (ICC)
International Civil Aviation Organization (ICAO)
International Criminal Court (ICCt) (signatory)
International Criminal Police Organization (Interpol)
International Federation of Red Cross and Red Crescent Societies (IFRCS)
International Hydrographic Organization (IHO)
International Maritime Organization (IMO)
International Mobile Satellite Organization (IMSO)
International Olympic Committee (IOC)
International Red Cross and Red Crescent Movement (ICRM)
International Telecommunication Union (ITU)
International Telecommunications Satellite Organization (ITSO)
Inter-Parliamentary Union (IPU)

Member state of the United Nations
Organisation internationale de la Francophonie (OIF)
Organization for Security and Cooperation in Europe (OSCE)
Organisation for the Prohibition of Chemical Weapons (OPCW)
Schengen Convention
United Nations Conference on Trade and Development (UNCTAD)
United Nations Educational, Scientific, and Cultural Organization (UNESCO)
United Nations Industrial Development Organization (UNIDO)
Universal Postal Union (UPU)
World Federation of Trade Unions (WFTU)
World Health Organization (WHO)
World Intellectual Property Organization (WIPO)
World Meteorological Organization (WMO)
World Tourism Organization (UNWTO)

Law and order in Monaco 
 Constitution of Monaco
 Human rights in Monaco
 Abortion in Monaco
 LGBT rights in Monaco
 Law enforcement in Monaco
 Compagnie des Carabiniers du Prince
 Capital punishment in Monaco

Military of Monaco 
Military of Monaco

History of Monaco 

History of Monaco
 Monarchy of Monaco
 Rulers
 List of rulers of Monaco

By period
 Anarchism in Monaco

By subject
 Monégasque Revolution
 Monaco Succession Crisis of 1918

House of Grimaldi 
House of Grimaldi

 Albert I, Prince of Monaco
 Albert II, Prince of Monaco
 Antonio I of Monaco
 Charles I, Lord of Monaco
 Charles III, Prince of Monaco
 Florestan I, Prince of Monaco
 François Grimaldi
 Grimaldo Canella
 Honoré II, Prince of Monaco

 Honoré III, Prince of Monaco
 Honoré IV, Prince of Monaco
 Honoré V, Prince of Monaco
 Jacques I, Prince of Monaco
 Louis II, Prince of Monaco
 Otto Canella
 Rainier I of Monaco, Lord of Cagnes
 Rainier III, Prince of Monaco
 Andrea Casiraghi

 Charlotte Casiraghi
 Pierre Casiraghi
 Stefano Casiraghi
 Louis Ducruet
 Pauline Ducruet
 Clelia Durazzo Grimaldi
 Elisabeth-Anne de Massy
 Louise-Hippolyte, Princess of Monaco
 Pierre de Polignac

Princes of Monaco
 Prince of Monaco
 Line of succession to the Monegasque Throne

Monegasque princesses
 Caroline, Princess of Hanover
 Princess Charlotte, Duchess of Valentinois
 Princess Stéphanie of Monaco

Culture of Monaco 

  

Culture of Monaco
 Architecture of Monaco
 Hôtel de Paris Monte-Carlo
 Monte Carlo Casino
 Opéra de Monte-Carlo
 Palaces in Monaco
 Prince's Palace of Monaco
 Monaco villas
 Sports venues in Monaco
 Stade Louis II
 Cuisine of Monaco
 Barbajuan
 Languages of Monaco
 French language
 Intemelio dialect
 Monégasque dialect
 Ligurian language (Romance)
 Genoese dialect
 Mentonasque
 Media in Monaco
 Radio stations in Monaco
 Television in Monaco
 Newspapers in Monaco
 Monegasque awards
 Orders, decorations, and medals of Monaco
 Order of the Crown (Monaco)
 Order of Grimaldi
 Orders and decorations of Monaco
 Order of St. Charles
 National symbols of Monaco
 Coat of arms of Monaco
 Flag of Monaco
 National anthem of Monaco
 People of Monaco
 Scouts in Monaco
 Titles in Monaco
 Counts and dukes of Rethel
 Duke of Valentinois
 Hereditary Prince of Monaco
 Marquis of Baux
 Prince of Monaco
 World Heritage Sites in Monaco: None

Art in Monaco 
 Public art in Monaco

Monegasque music
 Music of Monaco
 Opéra de Monte-Carlo
 Monte-Carlo Philharmonic Orchestra
 Les Ballets de Monte Carlo

Monegasque Eurovision songs

 À chacun sa chanson
 Allons, allons les enfants
 Bien plus fort
 Boum-Badaboum
 Ce soir-là
 Celui qui reste et celui qui s'en va
 Comme on s'aime
 Dis rien
 L'amour s'en va
 La Coco-Dance
 Les jardins de Monaco
 Maman, Maman
 Marlène
 Mon ami Pierrot
 Notre planète
 Notre vie c'est la musique
 Où sont-elles passées
 Toi, la musique et moi
 Tout de moi
 Un banc, un arbre, une rue
 Un train qui part
 Une chanson c'est une lettre
 Une petite française
 Va dire à l'amour

Religion in Monaco 
 Religion in Monaco
 Christianity in Monaco
 Roman Catholicism in Monaco
 Islam in Monaco
 Judaism in Monaco

Sports in Monaco 

Sport in Monaco
 Monaco at the Olympics
 1929 Monaco Grand Prix
 Monte-Carlo Masters
 Monegasque Rugby Federation
 Herculis
 Monaco national rugby union team
 Monte Carlo Open (golf)
 Monte Carlo Rally

Football in Monaco
 Football in Monaco
 AS Monaco FC
 Monaco national football team

AS Monaco FC
 2004 UEFA Champions League Final
 AS Monaco FC
 Stade Louis II

AS Monaco FC players

 Sonny Anderson
 Fabien Audard
 Fabien Barthez
 Bruno Bellone
 Ali Benarbia
 Lucas Bernardi
 Oliver Bierhoff
 Basile Boli
 Fabian Guedes
 Søren Busk
 Souleymane Camara
 Sebastian Carole
 Javier Chevantón
 Philippe Christanval
 John Collins
 Costinha
 Alain Couriol
 Éric Cubilier
 Ousmane Dabo
 Éric Di Meco
 David di Tommaso
 Marco Di Vaio
 Salif Diao
 Martin Djetou
 Youri Djorkaeff
 Cyril Domoraud
 Manuel dos Santos Fernandes
 Franck Dumas
 Ralf Edström
 Hassan El Fakiri
 Jean-Luc Ettori
 Patrice Evra
 Pontus Farnerud
 Amady Faye
 Youssouf Falikou Fofana
 Marcelo Gallardo
 Bernard Genghini
 David Gigliotti
 Ludovic Giuly
 Gaël Givet
 Marco Grassi
 Sébastien Grax
 Gilles Grimandi
 Mark Hateley
 Thierry Henry
 Glenn Hoddle
 Hugo Ibarra
 Victor Ikpeba
 Vladimir Jugović
 Franck Jurietti
 Mohamed Kallon
 Olivier Kapo
 Jürgen Klinsmann
 Jan Koller
 Muhamed Konjic
 Sabri Lamouchi
 Sylvain Legwinski
 Jerko Leko
 Philippe Léonard
 Søren Lerby
 Alexandre Licata
 Gerard López
 Mickaël Madar
 Rafael Márquez
 Camel Meriem
 Roger Milla
 Bora Milutinovic
 Sylvain Monsoreau
 Fernando Morientes
 Shabani Nonda
 Alex Nyarko
 Christian Panucci
 José Omar Pastoriza
 Diego Pérez
 Emmanuel Petit
 Stéphane Porato
 Dado Pršo
 Claude Puel
 Yannick Quesnel
 Florin Raducioiu
 John Arne Riise
 Julien Rodriguez
 Flavio Roma
 Jérôme Rothen
 Willy Sagnol
 Franck Sauzée
 Enzo Scifo
 Marco Simone
 Maicon Douglas Sisenando
 John Sivebæk
 Robert Špehar
 Sébastien Squillaci
 Tony Sylva
 Lilian Thuram
 Yaya Touré
 Armand Traoré
 David Trezeguet
 Gonzalo Vargas
 Christian Vieri
 Guillaume Warmuz
 George Weah
 Akis Zikos

Monaco Grand Prix

 Monaco Grand Prix
 1929 Monaco Grand Prix
 1950 Monaco Grand Prix
 1955 Monaco Grand Prix
 1956 Monaco Grand Prix
 1957 Monaco Grand Prix
 1958 Monaco Grand Prix
 1959 Monaco Grand Prix
 1960 Monaco Grand Prix
 1961 Monaco Grand Prix
 1962 Monaco Grand Prix
 1963 Monaco Grand Prix
 1964 Monaco Grand Prix
 1965 Monaco Grand Prix
 1966 Monaco Grand Prix
 1967 Monaco Grand Prix
 1968 Monaco Grand Prix
 1969 Monaco Grand Prix
 1970 Monaco Grand Prix
 1971 Monaco Grand Prix
 1972 Monaco Grand Prix

 1973 Monaco Grand Prix
 1974 Monaco Grand Prix
 1975 Monaco Grand Prix
 1976 Monaco Grand Prix
 1977 Monaco Grand Prix
 1978 Monaco Grand Prix
 1979 Monaco Grand Prix
 1980 Monaco Grand Prix
 1981 Monaco Grand Prix
 1982 Monaco Grand Prix
 1983 Monaco Grand Prix
 1984 Monaco Grand Prix
 1985 Monaco Grand Prix
 1987 Monaco Grand Prix
 1988 Monaco Grand Prix
 1989 Monaco Grand Prix
 1990 Monaco Grand Prix
 1991 Monaco Grand Prix
 1992 Monaco Grand Prix
 1993 Monaco Grand Prix
 1994 Monaco Grand Prix

 1995 Monaco Grand Prix
 1996 Monaco Grand Prix
 1997 Monaco Grand Prix
 1998 Monaco Grand Prix
 1999 Monaco Grand Prix
 2000 Monaco Grand Prix
 2001 Monaco Grand Prix
 2002 Monaco Grand Prix
 2003 Monaco Grand Prix
 2004 Monaco Grand Prix
 2005 Monaco Grand Prix
 2006 Monaco Grand Prix
 2007 Monaco Grand Prix
 2008 Monaco Grand Prix
 2009 Monaco Grand Prix
 2010 Monaco Grand Prix
 2011 Monaco Grand Prix
 2012 Monaco Grand Prix
 2013 Monaco Grand Prix
 2014 Monaco Grand Prix
 Circuit de Monaco

Monaco at the Olympics

 Monaco at the 1920 Summer Olympics
 Monaco at the 1924 Summer Olympics
 Monaco at the 1928 Summer Olympics
 Monaco at the 1936 Summer Olympics
 Monaco at the 1948 Summer Olympics
 Monaco at the 1952 Summer Olympics
 Monaco at the 1960 Summer Olympics
 Monaco at the 1964 Summer Olympics
 Monaco at the 1968 Summer Olympics
 Monaco at the 1972 Summer Olympics
 Monaco at the 1976 Summer Olympics
 Monaco at the 1984 Summer Olympics
 Monaco at the 1984 Winter Olympics

 Monaco at the 1988 Summer Olympics
 Monaco at the 1988 Winter Olympics
 Monaco at the 1992 Summer Olympics
 Monaco at the 1992 Winter Olympics
 Monaco at the 1994 Winter Olympics
 Monaco at the 1996 Summer Olympics
 Monaco at the 1998 Winter Olympics
 Monaco at the 2000 Summer Olympics
 Monaco at the 2002 Winter Olympics
 Monaco at the 2004 Summer Olympics
 Monaco at the 2006 Winter Olympics
 Monaco at the 2008 Summer Olympics
 Monaco at the 2010 Winter Olympics
 Monaco at the 2012 Summer Olympics
 Monaco at the 2014 Winter Olympics
 Monaco at the 2016 Summer Olympics
 Monaco at the 2018 Winter Olympics
 Monaco at the 2020 Summer Olympics

Economy and infrastructure of Monaco 

Economy of Monaco
 Economic rank, by nominal GDP (2007): 161st (one hundred and sixty first)
 Banks of Monaco
 Communications in Monaco
 Monaco Telecom
 La Poste Monaco
Currency of Monaco: Euro (see also: Euro topics)
ISO 4217: EUR
 Monegasque euro coins
 Previous currency:Monegasque franc
 Energy in Monaco
 Tourism in Monaco
 Hotels in Monaco
 Fairmont Monte Carlo
 Hôtel Hermitage Monte-Carlo
 Hotel Metropole, Monte Carlo
 Monte-Carlo Bay Hotel & Resort
 Hôtel de Paris Monte-Carlo
 Museums in Monaco
 Monaco Top Cars Collection
 Museum of Prehistoric Anthropology
 New National Museum of Monaco
 Oceanographic Museum
 Parks and botanical garden
 Casino Gardens and Terraces
 Fontvieille Park and Princess Grace Rose Garden
 Jardin Exotique de Monaco
 Japanese Garden, Monaco
 St Martin Gardens
 Restaurants and cafés in Monaco
 Le Louis XV
 Trade unions of Monaco
 Union of Monaco Trade Unions

Transport in Monaco 

 Transport in Monaco
 Chemin des Révoires
 Monaco Heliport
Heli Air Monaco
Monacair
 Port Hercules
 Rail transport in Monaco

Education in Monaco

 International School of Monaco
 Lycée Albert Premier
 International University of Monaco
 American College of Monaco

Health in Monaco 
Health in Monaco
 Cardiothoracic Center of Monaco
 Princess Grace Hospital Centre

Monegasque people

Businesspersons
 Gildo Pallanca Pastor

Judges
 Isabelle Berro-Lefèvre

Painters
 Jean-François Bosio
 Pierre Roland Renoir

Singers
 Laurent Vaguener
 Princess Stéphanie of Monaco

Sportspeople
 Benjamin Balleret
 Charles Leclerc
 Clivio Piccione
 Daniel Elena
 Louis Chiron
 Olivier Beretta
 Pierre Frolla
 Sebastien Gattuso

Writers and poets
 Léo Ferré
 Louis Notari

Other articles

See also 

 List of international rankings
 Outline of Europe

References

External links 

 
Official Government Portal
Official website of the Prince's Palace of Monaco
Official website for Tourism
CIA Factbook Entry for Monaco
History of Monaco: Primary documents
 Order of the doctors of Monaco
 La Principauti - The first monthly newspaper of Monaco, available also on line in 3D version
 
 

Outlines of countries